Mordellistena horvathi is a species of beetle in the family Mordellidae which is in the superfamily Tenebrionoidea. It was described in 1977 by Ermisch and can be found in Bulgaria, Czech Republic, Hungary, Republic of Macedonia and Slovakia.

References

horvathi
Beetles described in 1977
Beetles of Europe